Ploychompoo Somnonk (born 26 December 2002) is a Thai footballer who plays as a defender for the Thailand women's national team.

International goals

References

2002 births
Living people
Women's association football defenders
Ploychompoo Somnonk
Ploychompoo Somnonk
Ploychompoo Somnonk